The fourth season of the Malayalam-language version of Indian reality television series Bigg Boss is produced by Endemol Shine India and Banijay and broadcast on Asianet along with a 24x7 deferred stream on Disney+ Hotstar OTT platform. The season is hosted by Mohanlal for the fourth consecutive year and launched on 27 March 2022.

Dilsha Prasannan won the season's title at the show's grand finale scheduled 3 July 2022, with Blesslee finishing as the runner-up. Dilsha bagged the title of  first female winner of the show Bigg Boss Malayalam.

Ratings and viewership
Official ratings are taken from BARC India.

Housemates status

Housemates
The participants in the order of appearance and entered in house are:

Original entrants
 Naveen Arakkal - television actor.
 Janaki Sudheer - film actress and model.
 Lakshmi Priya - film and TV actress.
 Robin Radhakrishnan - doctor by profession and motivational speaker.
 Dhanya Mary Varghese - film and TV actress.
 Shalini Nair - master of ceremonies and VJ.
 Jasmine M. Moosa - fitness trainer.
 Akhil Kutty - film, TV artist, and comedian.
 Daisy David - photographer and grandniece of actress Philomina.
 Ronson Vincent - film and TV actor.
 Nimisha P S - model and Miss Kerala Pageant finalist.
 Aswin Vijay - magician and mentalist
 Aparna Mulberry - American-Chilean brought up in Kerala
 Sooraj Thelakkad - actor, comedian and TV presenter.
 Muhammad Diligent Blesslee - musician and lyricist.
 Dilsha Prasannan - TV actress and dancer.
 Suchithra Nair - TV actress.

Wildcard entrants
 Manikandan Thonnakkal - Malayalam teacher, Villadichampaatu performer, YouTuber, mimicry artist.
 Riyas Salim - social media influencer and engineer.
 Vinay Madhav - anchor, hotelier, chef and brother of Parvathy Nambiar

Production
The fourth season's lavish custom built house was set up at the Mumbai Film City. It was designed and conceptualized by the noted film director Omung Kumar.

Weekly summary

Guest appearance

Nomination table

Notes 
  indicates the House Captain.
  indicates the Nominees for house captaincy.
  indicates that the Housemate was directly nominated for eviction prior to the regular nominations process.
  indicates that the Housemate was granted immunity from nominations.
  indicates the winner.
  indicates the first runner up.
  indicates the second runner up.
  indicates the third runner up.
  indicates the fourth runner up.
  indicates the contestant as Weak Performer of the week.
  indicates the contestant has re-entered the house.
  indicates that the Housemate was in the Secret Room.
  indicates that the Housemate was in the Secret Room for violating Bigg Boss rules.
  indicates a new wildcard contestant.
  indicates the Eviction free pass has been used on a housemate.
  indicates the contestant has been walked out of the show.
  indicates the contestant has been evicted.

  : But all housemates were nominated by Bigg Boss, with the exception of the house captain.
  : Aswin Vijay lost his captaincy after being voted as the least performing contender, who was thereafter jailed. As a result, Naveen Arakkal took over the title, although his weekly eviction nomination remains the same.
  : Jasmine M Moosa won the task relief from going to BB prison.
  : Nimisha P S was evicted on Day 14 but was sent to a secret room by Bigg Boss.
  : Muhammad Diligent Blesslee was declared safe for the third week's eviction process after winning the task Bhagya Petakam.
  : Bigg Boss gave Dilsha Prasannan the power to nominate someone directly. Dilsha Prasannan nominated Akhil Kutty.
  : Nimisha P S re-entered on Bigg Boss on Day 16.
  : Muhammad Diligent Blesslee won the task relief from going to BB prison.
  : Manikandan Thonnakkal entered the Bigg boss house as Wildcard Contestant on Day 20.
  : Bigg Boss gave Ronson Vincent the power to save one of the nominees directly. He chose to save Naveen Arakkal.
  : Jasmine M Moosa won the task relief from going to BB prison.
  : Manikandan Thonnakkal walked out of Bigg Boss because of his health issues on Day 27.
  : Muhammad Diligent Blesslee and Lakshmi Priya won the task relief from going to BB prison.
  : Bigg Boss gave Akhil Kutty the power to directly nominate two contestants, not on the nominee list. He chose to nominate Muhammad Diligent Blesslee & Dilsha Prasannan.
  : Akhil Kutty won the jail task of relief from going to BB prison and Bigg Boss gave him the power to directly nominate another contestant to jail, and he choose Dilsha Prasannan.
  : The captaincy task contenders Dhanya Mary Varghese, Jasmine M Moosa, Lakshmi  Priya, Nimisha P S, Ronson Vincent, Sooraj Thelakkad, and Suchitra Nair received an offer of a Nomination free card which may be used up to the 10th week. Jasmine M Moosa won the Nomination free card alongside the Captaincy for Week 7.
  : Riyas Salim entered the Bigg boss house as Wildcard Contestant on Day 41 and entered the secret room.
  : Vinay Madhav entered the Bigg boss house as Wildcard Contestant on Day 42 and entered the secret room.
  : As No Eviction was passed at the end of Week 6, the nominees of Week 6 were nominated again for the Week 7 eviction process.
  : Riyas Salim and Vinay Madhav saved Lakshmi Priya from Week 7 eviction process.
  : Riyas Salim and Vinay Madhav entered the Bigg Boss house on Day 43.
  : Jasmine M Moosa won the task relief from going to BB prison.
  : Bigg Boss paired up the housemates and asked them to mutually decide to nominate one and save one.
  : Jasmine M Moosa used her Nomination-Free Card to save Ronson Vincent from the eviction process for Week 8.
  : Aparna Mulberry won the task relief from going to BB prison.
  : Bigg Boss grouped the housemates into four groups of three and asked them to decide & nominate one mutually from each group.
  : Muhammad Diligent Blesslee won the task relief from going to BB prison.
  : Suchitra Nair was stripped off the captaincy after she was evicted on Day 63. She chose Sooraj Thelakkad to take up the Captaincy for Week 10.
  : Riyas Salim and Robin Radhakrishnan were debarred from participating in the Week 10 Nomination Process following the penal verdict by the Host against their Week 7 offences.
  : During the weekly task, Robin Radhakrishnan had a physical altercation with Riyas Salim. Later, Bigg Boss announced that despite warnings, Robin Radhakrishnan continued to behave violently in the house and was thereby proved unfit for the show. As a result, he was temporarily moved to the Secret Room.
  : Muhammad Diligent Blesslee won the task relief from going to BB prison.
  : Jasmine M Moosa walked out of the house on Day 68 due to mental pressure.
  : Robin Radhakrishnan was ejected from the show on Day 69 for violating house rules.
  : There was No Eviction on Week 10 due to Jasmine M Moosa's walk out and Robin Radhakrishnan's ejection.
  : Akhil Kutty used his power to replace Muhammad Diligent Blesslee as a captaincy contender for Week 11.
  : Bigg Boss paired up the housemates and asked them to mutually decide to nominate one and save one.
  : Akhil Kutty was stripped off the captaincy after he was evicted on Day 77. He chose Sooraj Thelakkad to take up the captaincy for Week 12.
  : Riyas Salim won immunity from the 12th week eviction process after winning the task Hello My Dear Wrong Number.
  : On winning the ticket to finale during Week 12, Dilsha Prasannan was awarded direct entry into the finale week.
  : Although Dhanya Mary Varghese became the House Captain for Week 13, housemates could still nominate her for the eviction process.
  : Muhammad Diligent Blesslee won the task relief from going to BB prison.
  : Although Riyas Salim became the House Captain for Week 14, housemates could still nominate him for the finale week eviction process.
  : On Day 92, Muhammad Diligent Blesslee, Dhanya Mary Varghese, Dilsha Prasannan, Lakshmi Priya, Riyas Salim, and Sooraj Thelakkad announced as Top 6 finalists and directly nominate for finale week eviction process.

References

External links
 

2022 Indian television seasons
Asianet (TV channel) original programming
Malayalam-language television shows